Floyd F. Green (July 10, 1899 – January 12, 1952) was the 43rd mayor of Columbus, Ohio and the 39th person to serve in that office.

Green was born in Columbus in 1900. He served as a member of Columbus City Council from 1927 to 1931. He was elected mayor in 1939 and served Columbus during World War II.  After one term in office he was defeated in the 1943 mayoral election by Jim A. Rhodes. He died on January 12, 1952, from a cerebral hemorrhage.

References

Bibliography

External links 
Floyd F. Green at Political Graveyard

Ohio Republicans
Mayors of Columbus, Ohio
Columbus City Council members
1899 births
1952 deaths
20th-century American politicians